Ostrowy Tuszowskie  is a village in the administrative district of Gmina Cmolas, within Kolbuszowa County, Subcarpathian Voivodeship, in south-eastern Poland. 

The village has a population of 930.

References

Ostrowy Tuszowskie